Yagoda is a small town situated approximately  from Gampaha and  to the north-east of Colombo. It falls within the Gampaha Electorate.

Transport
Yagoda is the 14th railway station from Colombo Fort on the Main Line, which links Colombo and Kandy.

Notable individuals
 Maithripala Sirisena (7th President of Sri Lanka) - birthplace

References

Populated places in Gampaha District